

Events
Monk Eastman claims New York's East Side for the Eastman Gang, now numbering an estimated 1,100. This eventually begins a gang war between the Eastmans and Paul Kelly's Five Points Gang.
Evidence of La Mano Nera (The Black Hand), an Italian extortionist organization, is seen in Brooklyn, New York.
Sicilian Mafia Don Vito Cascio Ferro [Cascioferro] arrives in New York to become a major leader of La Mano Nera (The Black Hand).
A gang war begins between Tom Lee's On Leong Tong and an alliance of Wong Gets Hip Sings and Mock Duck's Four Brothers over gambling interests in New York's Chinatown. The war continues until a peace treaty is signed in 1909.

Arts and literature

Births
January 7 – Simone Scozzari, underboss of the Los Angeles crime family
March 18 – Ferdinand Boccia, New York City mobster
June 28 – Sam Mesi, Chicago (West Side) mobster and operator of three off-track betting operations
July 2 – Michael "Trigger Mike" Coppola, caporegime of the 116th Street Crew
October 12 – William Morris Bioff, Mafia extortionist

Deaths

References 

Years in organized crime
Organized crime